Divya is a settlement in administrative jurisdiction of the town of Dobryanka in Perm Krai, Russia, located  north-east of Perm.  Population:  3,600 (1962).

It was established in 1950 as a settlement serving the construction of a railway station.  It was granted urban-type settlement status on September 8, 1961.  In 1997, it was demoted in status back to that of a rural locality.

References

Rural localities in Perm Krai